Uemura ( characters for "Top" and "Village" or  characters for "plants in place" and "Village") is a Japanese surname. It can refer to:

Uemura Bunrakuken (植村文楽軒), originator of Bunraku
Uemura Masahisa (植村正久), Christian pastor
Uemura Shōen (植村松園), painter
Aiko Uemura (上村愛子), mogul skier
Ayako Uemura (上村彩子), voice actress
Haruki Uemura (上村春樹), judoka
Hiroyuki Uemura (上村洋行), jockey
Iemasa Uemura (植村家政), Hatamoto and Hansyu
Kana Uemura (植村花菜), Singer-songwriter
Kazuhiro Uemura (上村和裕), baseball player
Kei Uemura (植村慶), football player
Kenichi Uemura (voice actor) (上村健一), Japanese actor and voice actor
Kihatirou Uemura (植村喜八郎), baseball player
Kōgorō Uemura (1894–1978), Japanese businessman
Mai Uemura (上村麻衣), volleyball player
Masayuki Uemura (上村雅之), game hardware designer
, Japanese artistic gymnast
Naomi Uemura (植村直己), adventurer
Noriko Uemura (上村典子), Japanese voice actress
Shu Uemura (植村秀), make-up artist
Takako Uemura (上村貴子), Japanese voice actress
Tatsuya Uemura (上村建也), arcade game musician and programmer
, Japanese handball player
Yusuke Uemura (植村祐介), baseball player

See also
Kamimura ‐上村 can also read Kamimura.

Japanese-language surnames